Statistics of Qatar Stars League for the 1995–96 season.

Overview
It was contested by 9 teams, and Al-Arabi Sports Club won the championship.

League standings

References
Qatar - List of final tables (RSSSF)

1995–96 in Asian association football leagues
1995–96 in Qatari football